Deacon Lunchbox was the stage name of Atlanta performance artist and poet Timothy Tyson Ruttenber (1950 – April 19, 1992). Ruttenber, a construction worker by day, was popular in the Atlanta area for his flamboyant spoken-word performances. He often punctuated each line of his poems by banging an old torpedo casing or metal bucket with a hammer. His onstage props included a chainsaw, and often a bra was part of his costume.

Deacon is credited with giving the Atlanta alternative country music scene its name - the Redneck Underground. Bubbapalooza, named and led by the late Gregory Dean Smalley, is an annual Redneck Underground festival at Atlanta's Star Community Bar in Little Five Points, a three-night showcase for the Redneck Underground.

Ruttenber died in an auto accident, along with two members of the Atlanta group The Jody Grind (drummer, Rob Clayton, and their bassist, Robert Hayes). The three were riding in a rented cargo van in Montgomery, Alabama, at the time of the accident, when a drunk driver crossed the I-65 median and struck them head-on.

He appeared in Words in Your Face, a PBS documentary about spoken-word performers.

Film Appearances
Alive from Off Center - Words in Your Face (1991) PBS TV Episode
Benjamin Smoke (2000)
Coffeehouse: Atlanta's Underground Poets (1992) Documentary of Atlanta's Spoken Word scene, containing the last interview with Deacon Lunchbox.
Crash Course in Brain Sodomy (1990) by Kreg Thornley and Brett Lewis. Cameo appearance

Publications
Some Different Kinds of Songs (1989) A collection of monologues. Publisher: Drewry Lane Book Makers
The Complete Lunchbox: The Life and Works of Deacon Lunchbox, a Cornucopia of Southern Culture by Robert S. Roarty (Editor), Tim Ruttenber

Recordings
Rantin' 'n' Railin' (1990)
An Evening with the Garbageman and Deacon Lunchbox January 24, 1989 (WREK: The Underground Recordings)
The Mother of All Flagpole Christmas Albums (1992)

Poems
All I Want is Her Love and a Brand New Harley
Death of an Amway Salesman
I'm Bustin' Down the Road Doin' Sixty
I'm Just an Old Redneck Hippy
Lewis Grizzard I'm Calling You Out
Life in Midtown Atlanta
My Vacations Plans are Ruined
Nadine and Tony
Omni Beer
Quagmire of Skankmud
Yuppie Bastard

References

External links
 A Celebration of Deacon Lunchbox - audio files and poetry
 Different audio files and a write-up

American male poets